An enzyme-linked receptor, also known as a catalytic receptor, is a transmembrane receptor, where the binding of an extracellular ligand causes enzymatic activity on the intracellular side. Hence a catalytic receptor is an integral membrane protein possessing both catalytic, and receptor functions.

They have two important domains, an extra-cellular ligand binding domain and an intracellular domain, which has a catalytic function; and a single transmembrane helix.  The signaling molecule binds to the receptor on the outside of the cell and causes a conformational change on the catalytic function located on the receptor inside the cell.

Examples of the enzymatic activity include:
 Receptor tyrosine kinase, as in fibroblast growth factor receptor. Most enzyme-linked receptors are of this type.
 Serine/threonine-specific protein kinase, as in bone morphogenetic protein
 Guanylate cyclase, as in atrial natriuretic factor receptor

Types 

The following is a list of the five major families of catalytic receptors:

References

External links 
 Diagram at scq.ubc.ca
  Pharmacology and subcategories

Single-pass transmembrane proteins
Transmembrane receptors